The Trip to Marrakesh is a 1949 West German drama film directed by Richard Eichberg and starring Luise Ullrich, Maria Holst and Karl Ludwig Diehl. It was Eichberg's last film and his first in a decade, having spend time abroad since his two part Indian-set The Tiger of Eschnapur.

Production
The film is based on a play Le voyage à Marrakech by the French writer Benno Vigny.

It was made at the Bavaria Studios in Munich, with sets designed by the art directors Willi Herrmann and Heinrich Weidemann. Eichberg led a filming expedition to Morocco for location shooting. The final budget amounted to around one and half million deutschmarks.

Release
It premiered in Munich on 21 December 1949, aiming for the lucrative Christmas-time release market. The film was received with general hostility from critics.

Themes
While the film was in the same tradition as Eichberg's earlier films, with their exotic settings, it has drawn more notice for its underlying lesbian theme, which culminates in one female character shooting another dead.

Main cast
Luise Ullrich as Liliane
Maria Holst as Armande Colbert
Karl Ludwig Diehl as Professor Colbert
Paul Dahlke as Henry Orliac
Grethe Weiser as Loulou
Ludwig Linkmann as Bobby
Michael Korrontay as Jacques Bertal
Günther Evers as Capitain Blanchard
Viktor Afritsch as Ahmed Pasha
Ernst Fritz Fürbringer as Jean
Berthold Ebbecke as Dr. Grandler
Ulrich Beiger as Mixer

References

External links

1949 drama films
German drama films
West German films
Films directed by Richard Eichberg
German films based on plays
Films set in Morocco
Films set in Casablanca
Lesbian-related films
LGBT-related drama films
1940s LGBT-related films
German black-and-white films
1940s German-language films
1940s German films